The Lost Burro Formation is a Middle to Upper/Late Devonian geologic formation in the Mojave Desert of California in the Western United States.

Geology
The Dolomite formation is exposed in sections of the Darwin Hills, the Santa Rosa Hills, the Talc City Hills, the Inyo Mountains near the Cerro Gordo Mines, the Panamint Range near Towne Pass, and the Argus Range.

Fossils
Outcrops of the formation in Death Valley National Park have produced fossils of the placoderm Dunkleosteus terrelli, a small cladodont shark, the crushing tooth of a cochliodont, and the pteraspidid Blieckaspis priscillae.

References

 

Devonian California
Dolomite formations
Upper Devonian Series
Middle Devonian Series
Death Valley National Park
Geology of Inyo County, California
Natural history of the Mojave Desert
Inyo Mountains
Panamint Range
Devonian System of North America
Geologic formations of California